Tullio Mobiglia (April 12, 1911 – July 24, 1991) was an Italian jazz saxophonist and bandleader. He was born in Carezzano, and died, aged 80, in Helsinki.

Orchestras of Tullio Mobiglia

1941 - 1943 (in Germany) 

Tullio Mobiglia: tenor sax
Alfredo Marzaroli: trumpet
Francesco Paolo Ricci: alto sax, baritone sax, clarinet
Eraldo Romanoni: piano
Alfio Grasso: guitar
Carlo Pecori: double-bass, flute
Angelo Bartole: drums

1945 (Italy) 

Tullio Mobiglia: tenor sax
Arturo Botti: tenor sax
Giovanni Bocchia: alto sax, clarinet
Gino Ravera: alto sax
Vittorio Pavone: trumpet
Elettro Bartolucci: trumpet
Giovanni Vallarino: trombone
Mario Midana: trombone
Luciano Gambini: piano
Renzo Chiodi: guitar
Greco Maselli: double-bass
Renato Catellacci: drums

1946 (Italy) 

Tullio Mobiglia: tenor sax
Luigi Borromeo: tenor sax
Giovanni Bocchia: alto sax, clarinet
Arrigo Pagnini: alto sax, clarinet
Vittorio Pavone: trumpet
Elettro Bartolucci: trumpet
Giovanni Vallarino: trumpet
Mario Midana: trombone
Gianni Manzotti: piano
Renzo Chiodi: guitar
Greco Maselli: double-bass
Renato Catellacci: drums

Partial discography

33 rpm 

1973: The Charleston's Aces (Durium; with Mario Pezzotta)
1974: L'era del night (Durium; with Mario Pezzotta)

78 rpm 

1949: Ballate col bajon/Cuban mambo (Columbia)
1946 (26.4.1946) Rhumboogie -  Southern Fried  (Telefunken)

EP 

1957: The Deep Blue Sea (Durium, ep A 3034; with Carlo Savina)

45 rpm 

1961: Avventure di Capri/Italian Serenade (Durium, Ld A 7022)
1961: 'o sole mio/Maria Marì (Durium, Ld A 7023)
1961: Piccola/Do-re-mi cantare (Durium, Ld A 7024)
1961: Carolina dai!/Rosina (Durium, Ld A 7025)

CD 

2001 -The complete Tullio Mobiglia (1941-1946) (Riviera Jazz Records, RJR CD 004)

Italian jazz saxophonists
Male saxophonists
Italian jazz bandleaders
1911 births
1991 deaths
20th-century saxophonists
20th-century Italian male musicians
Male jazz musicians